Long Phú may refer to several places in Vietnam, including:

 Long Phú District, a rural district of Sóc Trăng Province
 Long Phú, An Giang, a ward of Tân Châu, An Giang
 Long Phú (township), a township and capital of Long Phú District
 Long Phú, Hậu Giang, a commune of Long Mỹ town
 Long Phú (commune in Sóc Trăng), a commune of Long Phú District
 Long Phú, Vĩnh Long, a commune of Tam Bình District

See also
 Phú Long (disambiguation)